Mom, Dad and Her (also called Just Breathe) is a 2008 television film directed by Anne Wheeler starring Melora Hardin and Paul McGillion. It was filmed in Fort Langley, Langley Township, British Columbia, Canada.

Plot
A bitter teen (Sydney), from a broken home, is sent to live with her remarried father (Ben), who hopes to make amends with his daughter as he moves on with his new wife (Emma) and baby. At first, Sydney lashes out, feeling abandoned yet again. Sydney misses her boyfriend, her city life and doesn't get on with her dad or stepmom. She unexpectedly finds herself connecting with her new stepmother, who is nervously expecting her first child. Slowly she starts to settle in as she makes friends with Jess, a local girl whose mother died of cancer. However, it is the relationship with her stepmother, and the birth of the new baby that finally heals the wounds left by her parents’ bitter divorce.

Cast
Melora Hardin as Emma
Paul McGillion as Ben
Brittney Wilson as Sydney
Sarah Deakins as Lynn
Tantoo Cardinal as Heather
Jesse Moss as Zach
Kyla Hazelwood as Jess
Anna Amoroso asTara
Dorla Bell as Robin
Paul Bae as Resident
Tom Heaton as Norman
Pale Christian Thomas as Bartender (as Thomas Pale)
Lossen Chambers as Admissions Clerk
Monica Mustelier as Nurse
Patricia Mayen-Salazar as Woman
Dean Hinchey as Priest

External links

Mom, Dad and Her at TV Guide
Mom, Dad and Her at myLifetime.com
NY Times Overview

Canadian drama television films
English-language Canadian films
2008 television films
2008 films
Lifetime (TV network) films
Films directed by Anne Wheeler
American drama television films
2000s English-language films
2000s American films
2000s Canadian films